Fulton High School may refer to:

Fulton High School, now merged into South Atlanta High School, Georgia
Fulton High School (Illinois) in Fulton, Illinois
Fulton High School (Kansas) formerly in Fulton, Kansas
Fulton High School (Kentucky) in Fulton, Kentucky
Fulton High School (Tennessee) in Knoxville, Tennessee
 Fulton High School in Fulton, Missouri - Fulton 58 School District